Konstantinos Tsoupros (born 20 July 1991) is a Greek professional footballer who plays as a centre-back.

Honours
AEK Athens
Football League 2: 2013–14 (6th Group)

References

External links

Myplayer.gr Profile

1991 births
Living people
Greek footballers
Greek expatriate footballers
AEK Athens F.C. players
Panachaiki F.C. players
Association football defenders
Panelefsiniakos F.C. players
P.O. Xylotymbou players
ASIL Lysi players
Super League Greece players
Football League (Greece) players
Gamma Ethniki players
Cypriot Second Division players
Expatriate footballers in Cyprus
Greek expatriates in Cyprus
Footballers from Central Greece
People from Euboea (regional unit)